Buzkashi Boys is a 2012 film, co-produced in Afghanistan and the United States. It was nominated for the 2013 Academy Award for Best Live Action Short Film.

After being nominated for an Oscar, the film was released along with all the other 15 Oscar-nominated short films in theaters by ShortsHD.

Plot
Filmed entirely on location in Kabul, Afghanistan, Buzkashi Boys tells the coming of age story of two best friends – a street urchin and a blacksmith's son  who dream of a better life. Rafi, whose family has long worked in blacksmith trade, bridles under his father's insistence that he follow in his footsteps.

His best friend Ahmad, a penniless orphan, survives by begging for coins in exchange for a puff of incense from his makeshift censer—a tin can swung from a piece of wire. Seeking to escape their destinies, the two friends dream of becoming champion horsemen in Afghanistan's national sport, Buzkashi—a dangerous form of polo played on horseback with a headless goat carcass instead of a ball. When Ahmad decides to steal a horse to prove he can realize his dreams, things spiral out of control and Rafi must come to terms with the reality of his situation.

Set on the harsh and stunning backdrop of Kabul city, Buzkashi Boys is a tale of two boys growing to adulthood in one of the most war torn countries on earth.

Filmed entirely on location in Kabul by an alliance of Afghan and international filmmakers, Buzkashi Boys is a look at life that continues beyond the headlines of war in Afghanistan.

Accolades

Film festival awards
L.A. Shorts Fest – Drama: Best-of Category
Raindance Film Festival – Best International Short Film
UK Film Festival – Best Cinematography
Evolution International Film Festival – Best Short Film
Rhode Island International Film Festival – Best Cinematography
ÉCU The European Independent Film festival  Best Non-European Independent Dramatic Short 2013

Award nominations
85th Academy Awards – Best Live Action Short Film

See also
The Boxing Girls of Kabul, a 2012 documentary directed by Ariel Nasr

References

External links

 
 

2010s sports films
Sport in Afghanistan
2010s coming-of-age films
Afghan drama films
Films scored by James Dooley
Kickstarter-funded films
Afghan short films